The Ancient and Accepted Scottish Rite of Freemasonry (the Northern Masonic Jurisdiction in the United States often omits the and, while the English Constitution in the United Kingdom omits the Scottish), commonly known as simply the Scottish Rite (or, in England and Australia, as the Rose Croix although this is only one of its degrees), is one of several Rites of Freemasonry. A Rite is a progressive series of degrees conferred by various Masonic organizations or bodies, each of which operates under the control of its own central authority. In the Scottish Rite the central authority is called a Supreme Council.

The Scottish Rite is one of the appendant bodies of Freemasonry that a Master Mason may join for further exposure to the principles of Freemasonry.  It is also concordant, in that some of its degrees relate to the degrees of Symbolic (Craft) Freemasonry. In England and some other countries, while the Scottish Rite is not accorded official recognition by the Grand Lodge, only a recognized Freemason may join and there is no prohibition against his doing so. The Scottish Rite builds upon the ethical teachings and philosophy offered in the Craft (or Blue) Lodge, through dramatic presentation of the individual degrees.

History

Legend of Jacobite origins
The seed or the myth of Stuart Jacobite influence on the higher degrees may have been a careless and unsubstantiated remark made by John Noorthouk in the 1784 Book of Constitutions of the Premier Grand Lodge of London. It was stated, without support, that King Charles II (older brother and predecessor to James II) was made a Freemason in the Netherlands during the years of his exile (1649–60). However, there were no documented lodges of Freemasons on the continent during those years. The statement may have been made to flatter the fraternity by claiming membership for a previous monarch. This folly was then embellished by John Robison (1739–1805), a professor of Natural Philosophy at the University of Edinburgh, in an anti-Masonic work published in 1797. The lack of scholarship exhibited by Robison in that work caused the Encyclopædia Britannica to denounce it.

A German bookseller and Freemason, living in Paris, working under the assumed name of C. Lenning, embellished the story further in a manuscript titled "Encyclopedia of Freemasonry" probably written between 1822 and 1828 at Leipzig. This manuscript was later revised and published by another German Freemason named Friedrich Mossdorf (1757–1830). Lenning stated that King James II of England, after his flight to France in 1688, resided at the Jesuit College of Clermont, where his followers fabricated certain degrees for the purpose of carrying out their political ends.

By the mid-19th century, the story had gained currency. The well-known English Masonic writer, Dr. George Oliver (1782–1867), in his Historical Landmarks, 1846, carried the story forward and even claimed that King Charles II was active in his attendance at meetings—an obvious invention, for if it had been true, it would not have escaped the notice of the historians of the time. The story was then repeated by the French writers Jean-Baptiste Ragon (1771–1862) and Emmanuel Rebold, in their Masonic histories. Rebold's claim that the high degrees were created and practiced in Lodge Canongate Kilwinning at Edinburgh are entirely false.

James II died in 1701 at the Palace of St. Germain en Laye, and was succeeded in his claims to the English, Irish and Scottish thrones by his son, James Francis Edward Stuart (1699–1766), the Chevalier St. George, better known as "the Old Pretender", but recognized as James III & VIII by the French King Louis XIV. He was succeeded in his claim by Charles Edward Stuart ("Bonnie Prince Charles"), also known as "the Young Pretender", whose ultimate defeat at the Battle of Culloden in 1746 effectively put an end to any serious hopes of the Stuarts regaining the British crowns.

The natural confusion between the names of the Jesuit College of Clermont, and the short-lived Masonic Chapter of Clermont, a Masonic body that controlled a few high degrees during its brief existence, only served to add fuel to the myth of Stuart Jacobite influence in Freemasonry's high degrees. However, the College and the Chapter had nothing to do with each other. The Jesuit College was located at Clermont, whereas the Masonic Chapter was not. Rather, it was named "Clermont" in honor of the French Grand Master, the Comte de Clermont (Louis de Bourbon, Comte de Clermont) (1709–1771), and not because of any connection with the Jesuit College of Clermont.

Estienne Morin

A French trader, by the name of Estienne Morin, had been involved in high-degree Masonry in Bordeaux since 1744 and, in 1747, founded an "Écossais" lodge (Scottish Lodge) in the city of Le Cap Français, on the north coast of the French colony of Saint-Domingue (now Haiti). Over the next decade, high-degree Freemasonry was carried by French men to other cities in the Western hemisphere. The high-degree lodge at Bordeaux warranted or recognized seven Écossais lodges there.

In Paris in the year 1761, a patent was issued to Estienne Morin, dated 27 August, creating him "Grand Inspector for all parts of the New World". This Patent was signed by officials of the Grand Lodge at Paris and appears to have originally granted him power over the craft lodges only, and not over the high, or "Écossais", degree lodges. Later copies of this Patent appear to have been embellished, probably by Morin, to improve his position over the high-degree lodges in the West Indies.

Morin returned to the West Indies in 1762 or 1763, to Saint-Domingue. Based on his new Patent, he assumed powers to constitute lodges of all degrees, spreading the high degrees throughout the West Indies and North America. Morin stayed in Saint-Domingue until 1766, when he moved to Jamaica. At Kingston, Jamaica, in 1770, Morin created a "Grand Chapter" of his new Rite (the Grand Council of Jamaica). Morin died in 1771 and was buried in Kingston.

Rite of 25 Degrees

Early writers long believed that a "Rite of Perfection" consisting of 25 degrees, (the highest being the "Sublime Prince of the Royal Secret", and being the predecessor of the Scottish Rite), had been formed in Paris by a high-degree council calling itself "The Council of Emperors of the East and West". The title "Rite of Perfection" first appeared in the Preface to the "Grand Constitutions of 1786", the authority for which is now known to be faulty.

It is now generally accepted that this Rite of twenty-five degrees was compiled by Estienne Morin and is more properly called "The Rite of the Royal Secret", or "Morin's Rite".

However, it was known as "The Order of Prince of the Royal Secret" by the founders of the Scottish Rite, who mentioned it in their "Circular throughout the two Hemispheres" or "Manifesto", issued on December 4, 1802.

Henry Andrew Francken and his manuscripts
Henry Andrew Francken, a naturalized French subject born as 
Hendrick Andriese Franken of Dutch origin, was most important in assisting Morin in spreading the degrees in the New World. Morin appointed him Deputy Grand Inspector General (DGIG) as one of his first acts after returning to the West Indies. Francken worked closely with Morin and, in 1771, produced a manuscript book giving the rituals for the 15th through the 25th degrees. Francken produced at least four such manuscripts. In addition to the 1771 manuscript, there is a second which can be dated to 1783; a third manuscript, of uncertain date, written in Francken's handwriting, with the rituals 4–25°, which was found in the archives of the Provincial Grand Lodge of Lancashire in Liverpool in approximately 1984; and a fourth, again of uncertain date, with rituals 4–24°, which was known to have been given by H. J. Whymper to the District Grand Lodge of the Punjab and rediscovered about 2010. Additionally, there is a French manuscript dating from 1790 to 1800 which contains the 25 degrees of the Order of the Royal Secret with additional detail, as well as three other Hauts Grades rituals; its literary structure suggests it is derived from a common source as the Francken Manuscripts.

Scottish Perfection Lodges

A Loge de Parfaits d' Écosse was formed on 12 April 1764 at New Orleans, becoming the first high-degree lodge on the North American continent. Its life, however, was short, as the Treaty of Paris (1763) ceded New Orleans to Spain, and the Catholic Spanish crown had been historically hostile to Freemasonry. Documented Masonic activity ceased for a time. It did not return to New Orleans until the late 1790s, when French refugees from the revolution in Saint-Domingue settled in the city.

Francken traveled to New York in 1767 where he granted a Patent, dated 26 December 1767, for the formation of a Lodge of Perfection at Albany, which was called "Ineffable Lodge of Perfection". This marked the first time the Degrees of Perfection (the 4th through the 14th) were conferred in one of the Thirteen British colonies in North America. This Patent, and the early minutes of the Lodge, are still extant and are in the archives of Supreme Council, Northern Jurisdiction. (The minutes of Ineffable Lodge of Perfection reveal that it ceased activity on December 5, 1774. It was revived by Giles Fonda Yates about 1820 or 1821, and came under authority of the Supreme Council, Southern Jurisdiction until 1827. That year it was transferred to the Supreme Council, Northern Jurisdiction.)

While in New York City, Francken also communicated the degrees to Moses Michael Hays, a Jewish businessman, and appointed him as a Deputy Inspector General. In 1781, Hays made eight Deputy Inspectors General, four of whom were later important in the establishment of Scottish Rite Freemasonry in South Carolina:
Isaac Da Costa, Sr., D.I.G. for South Carolina;
Abraham Forst, D.I.G. for Virginia;
Joseph M. Myers, D.I.G. for Maryland;
Barend M. Spitzer, D.I.G. for Georgia.

Da Costa returned to Charleston, South Carolina, where he established the "Sublime Grand Lodge of Perfection" in February 1783. After Da Costa's death in November 1783, Hays appointed Myers as Da Costa's successor. Joined by Forst and Spitzer, Myers created additional high-degree bodies in Charleston.

Physician Hyman Isaac Long from the island of Jamaica, who settled in New York City, went to Charleston in 1796 to appoint eight French men; he had received his authority through Spitzer. These men had arrived as refugees from Saint-Domingue, where the slave revolution was underway that would establish Haiti as an independent republic in 1804. They organized a Consistory of the 25th Degree, or "Princes of the Royal Secret," which Masonic historian Brigadier ACF Jackson says became the first Supreme Council of the Scottish Rite. According to Fox, by 1801, the Charleston bodies were the only extant bodies of the Rite in North America.

Birth of the Scottish Rite
Although most of the thirty-three degrees of the Scottish Rite existed in parts of previous degree systems, the Scottish Rite did not come into being until the formation of the Mother Supreme Council at Charleston, South Carolina, in May 1801 at Shepheard's Tavern at the corner of Broad and Church Streets (the tavern had been the location of the founding of Freemasonry in South Carolina in 1754). The Founding Fathers of the Scottish Rite who attended became known as "The Eleven Gentlemen of Charleston".
John Mitchell – Received a patent April 2, 1795, from Barend Moses Spitzer granting him authority as Deputy Inspector General to create a Lodge of Perfection and several Councils and Chapters wherever such Lodges or Chapters were needed.  Born in Ireland in 1741, he came to America at an early age. He served as Deputy Quartermaster General in the Continental Army, and was the first Grand Commander of the Supreme Council.
Frederick Dalcho – A physician, he served in the Revolutionary Army and was stationed at Fort Johnson.  He formed a partnership in 1801 with Dr. Isaac Auld, another of the original members. He was an outstanding orator and author.  In 1807 he published the first edition of Ahiman Rezon. He became an editor of the Charleston Courier, was a lay reader and deacon in the Episcopal Church, and in 1818 was ordained as a priest.
Alexandre Francois Auguste de Grasse, known as Comte de Grasse-Tilly. He was born in France as the eldest legitimate son of François Joseph Paul de Grasse, a French admiral known as a hero of the American Revolution for defeating the British fleet in the Battle of the Chesapeake. He inherited his father's title, and likely had the highest social ranking of the original eleven founders. He was the youngest of the members and was named to become the Grand Commander of the West Indian Islands. After Napoleon came to power, de Grasse returned to France and resumed his military career. He also extended Freemasonry, establishing the Supreme Council of France and councils in other European cities.
Jean-Baptiste Marie de La Hogue – He was a native of Paris who had lived in Saint-Domingue until the revolution there; father-in-law of de Grasse, he was a founding member of La Candeur Lodge in Charleston.
Thomas Bartholemew Bowen – Was the first Grand Master of Ceremonies of the new Supreme Council.  He was a Major in the Continental Army and a printer by trade.
Abraham Alexander – Was one of the first Sovereign Grand Inspectors General. He was born in London in 1743, and immigrated to Charleston in 1771.  He was a prominent Sephardic Jew and had been described as "a Calligraphist of the first order"; he was elected as the first Grand Secretary General.
Emanuel de la Motta – A Sovereign Grand Inspector General. Also a Sephardic Jew, he was by trade a merchant and auctioneer. He was a member of Friendship Lodge and was reported to be devoted to the study of Jewish literature and Masonry. 
Isaac Auld – An eminent physician, associated in medical practice with Dr. Dalcho. He was a strong Congregationalist.
Israel de Lieben – A Sovereign Grand Inspector General and the first Grand Treasurer General. He was born in Prague and emigrated to the United States at 21. He was known as "the liberal-headed Jew", who was "tolerant in his religious opinions" and was considered to be intelligent, enterprising, liberal and generous.
Moses Clava Levy – Born in Krakow, Poland, he was a prosperous merchant, was generous and helpful to the unfortunate, and devoted to his adopted city and country.
James Moultrie – the only native South Carolinian among the original members. He was a physician, and according to Albert Pike, "was one of the foremost Citizens of South Carolina".
Isaac Da Costa, another Sephardic Jew, was one of the deputies commissioned to establish Morin's Rite of the Royal Secret in other countries; he formed constituent bodies of the Rite in South Carolina in 1783. These are considered to have become in 1801, The Supreme Council of the Ancient and Accepted Scottish Rite, Southern Jurisdiction.  All regular Scottish Rite bodies today derive their heritage from this body.

Subsequently, other Supreme Councils were formed in Saint-Domingue (now Haiti) in 1802, in France in 1804, in Italy in 1805, and in Spain in 1811.

On May 1, 1813, an officer from the Supreme Council at Charleston initiated several New York Masons into the Thirty-third Degree and organized a Supreme Council for the "Northern Masonic District and Jurisdiction". On May 21, 1814 this Supreme Council reopened and proceeded to "nominate, elect, appoint, install and proclaim in due, legal and ample form" the elected officers "as forming the second Grand and Supreme Council...". Finally, the charter of this organization (written January 7, 1815) added, “We think the Ratification ought to be dated 21st day May 5815."

Officially, the Supreme Council, 33°, N.M.J. dates itself from May 15, 1867. This was the date of the "Union of 1867", when it merged with the competing Cerneau "Supreme Council" in New York. The current Ancient and Accepted Scottish Rite, Northern Masonic Jurisdiction of the United States, was thus formed.

Albert Pike

Born in Boston, Massachusetts on December 29, 1809, Albert Pike is asserted within the Southern Jurisdiction as the man most responsible for the growth and success of the Scottish Rite from an obscure Masonic Rite in the mid-19th century to the international fraternity that it became. Pike received the 4th through the 32nd Degrees in March 1853 from Albert Mackey, in Charleston, South Carolina, and was appointed Deputy Inspector for Arkansas that same year.

At this point, the degrees were in a rudimentary form, and often included only a brief history and legend of each degree, as well as other brief details which usually lacked a workable ritual for their conferral. In 1855, the Supreme Council appointed a committee to prepare and compile rituals for the 4th through the 32nd Degrees. That committee was composed of Albert G. Mackey, John H. Honour, William S. Rockwell, Claude P. Samory, and Albert Pike. Of these five committee members, Pike did all the work of the committee.

In 1857 Pike completed his first revision of the 4°-32° ritual, and printed 100 copies. This revision, which Mackey dubbed the "Magnum Opus", was never adopted by the Supreme Council. According to Arturo de Hoyos, 33°, the Scottish Rite's Grand Historian, the Magnum Opus became the basis for future ritual revisions.

In March 1858, Pike was elected a member of the Supreme Council for the Southern Jurisdiction of the United States, and in January 1859 he became its Grand Commander. The American Civil War interrupted his work on the Scottish Rite rituals. About 1870 he, and the Supreme Council, moved to Washington, DC. In 1884 his revision of the rituals was complete.

Scottish Rite Grand Archivist and Grand Historian de Hoyos created the following chart of Pike's ritual revisions:

Pike also wrote lectures about all the degrees, which were published in 1871 under the title Morals and Dogma of the Ancient and Accepted Scottish Rite of Freemasonry.

Revisions after Pike
In 2000 the Southern Jurisdiction revised its ritual.  The current ritual is based upon Pike's, but with some differences.

Degree structure
The thirty-three degrees of the Scottish Rite are conferred by several controlling bodies. The first of these is the Craft Lodge, which confers the Entered Apprentice, Fellowcraft, and Master Mason degrees. Craft lodges operate under the authority of national (or in the US, state) Grand Lodges, not the Scottish Rite. Attainment of the third Masonic degree, that of a Master Mason, represents the attainment of the highest rank in all of Masonry. Additional degrees such as those of the AASR are sometimes referred to as appendant degrees, even where the degree numbering might imply a hierarchy. They represent a lateral movement in Masonic education rather than an upward movement, and are degrees of instruction rather than rank.

In 2000, the Southern Jurisdiction in the United States completed a revision of its ritual scripts. In 2004, the Northern Jurisdiction in the United States rewrote and reorganized its degrees.  Further changes have occurred in 2006. The current titles of the degrees and their arrangement in the Southern Jurisdiction remains substantially unchanged from the beginning.

The list of degrees for the Supreme Councils of Australia, England and Wales, and most other jurisdictions largely agrees with that of the Southern Jurisdiction of the U.S.  However, the list of degrees for the Northern Jurisdiction of the United States is now somewhat different and is given in the table below.  The list of degrees of the Supreme Council of Canada reflects a mixture of the two, with some unique titles as well:

AASR Craft Degrees

The AASR does have its own distinctive versions of the Craft rituals (Entered Apprentice, Fellow Craft, and Master Mason), but most lodges throughout the English-speaking world do not work in them. However, there are 10 lodges in New Orleans and 16 in New York City that work in the Scottish Rite Craft degrees.

The AASR craft degrees are more common in Europe and Latin-American jurisdictions. All lodges in the International Order of Freemasonry for Men & Women, LE DROIT HUMAIN work "seamlessly from the first to the thirty-third degree and practises only one rite, the Ancient and Accepted Scottish Rite (A&ASR). These two characteristics define it as an Order and not as an Obedience". Most lodges under the jurisdiction of the Grande Loge de France use these degrees, as do a few of the lodges under the jurisdiction of the Grande Loge Nationale Française. It is a dominant ritual, out of the other rituals in use, in the Grand Lodge of Spain. There are two Lodges in Australia that practise the AASR Craft degrees, The Zetland Lodge of Australia No. 9 and Lodge France 1021, both of which are under the United Grand Lodge of New South Wales and the Australian Capital Territory.

According to Masonic historian Alain Bernheim, Belgian Masonic scholar Pierre Noël demonstrated in a 2002 paper that the AASR Craft degrees derived from the French translation of the Masonic exposé Three Distinct Knocks, issued in London in 1760.

Scots Master Degree
There are records of lodges conferring the degree of "Scots Master" or "Scotch Master" as early as 1733. A lodge at Temple Bar in London is the earliest such lodge on record. Other lodges include a lodge at Bath in 1735, and the French lodge, St. George de l'Observance No. 49 at Covent Garden in 1736. The references to these few occasions indicate that these were special meetings held for the purpose of performing unusual ceremonies, probably by visiting Freemasons.  The Copiale cipher, dating from the 1740s says, "The rank of a Scottish master is an entirely new invention..."

Organization
The Ancient and Accepted Scottish Rite in each country is governed by a Supreme Council. There is no international governing body aside for Le Droit Humain, which is an international order; all other Supreme Councils in each country is sovereign unto itself in its own jurisdiction.

Canada
In Canada, whose Supreme Council was warranted in 1874 by that of England and Wales, the Rite is known as Ancient and Accepted Scottish Rite.  The council is called "Supreme Council 33° Ancient and Accepted Scottish Rite of Freemasonry of Canada". Canada's Supreme Council office is located at 4 Queen Street South in Hamilton, Ontario. There are 45 local units or "Valleys" across Canada.

France
When Comte de Grasse-Tilly returned to France in 1804, he worked to establish the Ancient and Accepted Scottish Rite there. He founded the first Supreme Council in France that same year.

The Grand Orient of France signed a treaty of union in December 1804 with the Supreme Council of the 33rd Degree in France; the treaty declared that "the Grand Orient united to itself" the Supreme Council in France. This accord was applied until 1814. Thanks to this treaty, the Grand Orient of France took ownership, as it were, of the Scottish Rite.

From 1805 to 1814, the Grand Orient of France administered the first 18 degrees of the Rite, leaving the Supreme Council of France to administer the last 15. In 1815, five of the leaders of the Supreme Council founded the Suprême Conseil des Rites within the Grand Orient of France. The original Supreme Council of France fell dormant from 1815 to 1821.

The Suprême Conseil des Isles d'Amérique (founded in 1802 by Grasse-Tilly and revived around 1810 by his father-in-law Delahogue, who had also returned from the United States) breathed new life into the Supreme Council for the 33rd Degree in France. They merged into a single organization: the Supreme Council of France. This developed as an independent and sovereign Masonic power. It created symbolic lodges (those composed of the first three degrees, which otherwise would be federated around a Grand Lodge or a Grand Orient).

The Suprême Conseil de France (emerging from the Supreme Council of 1804 and restored in 1821 by the Supreme Council of the Isles d'Amérique founded in 1802 in Saint-Domingue, the modern Haiti)
In 1894, the Supreme Council of France created the Grand Lodge of France. It became fully independent in 1904, when the Supreme Council of France ceased chartering new lodges. The Supreme Council of France still considers itself the overseer of all 33 degrees of the Rite. Relations between the two structures remain close, as shown by their organizing two joint meetings a year.

France has two additional Supreme Councils:
 The Suprême Conseil Grand Collège du Rite écossais ancien accepté (emerging from the Supreme Council on 1804 and constituted in 1815), affiliated with the Grand Orient de France.
 The Suprême Conseil pour la France (emerging from the Supreme Council of the Netherlands, constituted in 1965), affiliated with the Grande Loge Nationale Française. In 1964, the Sovereign Grand Commander Charles Riandey, along with 400 to 500 members, left the jurisdiction of the Supreme Council of France and joined the Grande Loge Nationale Française. Because of his resignation and withdrawal of hundreds of members, there was no longer a Supreme Council of France. Riandey then reinitiated the 33 degrees of the rite in Amsterdam. With the support of the Supreme Council of the Southern Jurisdiction of the United States, he founded a new Supreme Council in France, called the Suprême Conseil pour la France.

Romania
The Ancient and Accepted Scottish Rite was established in Romania in 1881, a year after the National Grand Lodge of Romania was founded.  On 27 December 1922, the Supreme Council of Scottish Rite of Romania, received the recognition of the Supreme Council of France in 1922, and recognition from the Supreme Council, Southern Jurisdiction of the United States in 1925.

Between 1948 and 1989 all of Romanian Freemasonry, including the Ancient and Accepted Scottish Rite of Romania, was banned by the Communist regime.

The Supreme Council of the Ancient and Accepted Scottish Rite of Romania was reconsecrated in 1993.

United Kingdom

In England and Wales, whose Supreme Council was warranted by that of the Northern Jurisdiction of the USA (in 1845), the Rite is known colloquially as the "Rose Croix" or more formally as "The Ancient and Accepted Rite for England and Wales and its Districts and Chapters Overseas" (continental European jurisdictions retain the "Écossais"). England and Wales are divided into Districts, which administer the Rose Croix Chapters within their District; many degrees are conferred in name only, and degrees beyond the 18° are conferred only by the Supreme Council itself.

All candidates for membership must profess the Trinitarian Christian faith and have been Master masons for at least one year.

In England and Wales, the candidate is perfected in the 18th degree with the preceding degrees awarded in name only.  Continuing to the 30th degree is restricted to those who have served in the chair of the Chapter.  Elevation beyond the 30th degree is as in Scotland.

In Scotland, candidates are perfected in the 18th degree, with the preceding degrees awarded in name only. A minimum of a two-year interval is required before continuing to the 30th degree, again with the intervening degrees awarded by name only.  Elevation beyond that is by invitation only, and numbers are severely restricted.

United States

In the United States of America there are three Supreme Councils: one in Washington, D.C. (which controls the Southern Jurisdiction), one in Lexington, Massachusetts (which controls the Northern Masonic Jurisdiction) as well as the Supreme Council of Louisiana. They each have particular characteristics that make them different.

In the United States, members of the Scottish Rite can be elected to receive the 33° by the Supreme Council. It is conferred on members who have made major contributions to society or to Masonry in general.

Southern Jurisdiction
Based in Washington, D.C., the Southern Jurisdiction (often referred to as the "Mother Supreme Council of the World") was founded in Charleston, South Carolina, in 1801. It oversees the Ancient and Accepted Scottish Rite in 35 states, which are referred to as Orients, which are divided into regions called Valleys, each containing individual bodies.

In the Southern Jurisdiction of the United States, the Supreme Council consists of no more than 33 members and is presided over by a Sovereign Grand Commander. The current Sovereign Grand Commander is Illustrious Brother James D. Cole, 33°. Other members of the Supreme Council are called "Sovereign Grand Inspectors General" (S.G.I.G.), and each is the head of the AASR bodies in his respective Orient (or state). Other heads of the various Orients who are not members of the Supreme Council are called "Deputies of the Supreme Council". The Supreme Council of the Southern Jurisdiction meets every odd year during the month of August at the House of the Temple, Ancient and Accepted Scottish Rite of Freemasonry Southern Jurisdiction Headquarters, in Washington, D.C. During this conference, closed meetings between the Grand Commander and the S.G.I.G.s are held, and many members of the fraternity from all over the world attend the open ceremony on the 5th of 6 council meeting days.

In the Southern Jurisdiction, a member who has been a 32° Scottish Rite Mason for 46 months or more is eligible to be elected to receive the "rank and decoration" of Knight Commander of the Court of Honour (K.C.C.H.) in recognition of outstanding service. After 46 months as a K.C.C.H. he is then eligible to be elected to the 33rd degree, upon approval of the Supreme Council and Sovereign Grand Commander.

Northern Jurisdiction
The Lexington, Massachusetts-based Northern Masonic Jurisdiction, formed in 1813, oversees the bodies in fifteen states: Connecticut, Delaware, Illinois, Indiana, Maine, Massachusetts, Michigan, New Jersey, New Hampshire, New York, Ohio, Pennsylvania, Rhode Island, Wisconsin and Vermont.  The Northern Jurisdiction is only divided into Valleys, not Orients.  Each Valley has up to four Scottish Rite bodies, and each body confers a set of degrees.

In the Northern Jurisdiction, the Supreme Council consists of no more than 66 members. Those who are elected to membership on the Supreme Council are then designated "Active." In the Northern Jurisdiction
all recipients of the 33rd Degree are honorary members of the Supreme Council, and all members are referred to as a "Sovereign Grand Inspectors General."  The head of the Rite in each State of the Northern Jurisdiction is called a "Deputy of the Supreme Council."  Thus the highest ranking Scottish Rite officer in Ohio, is titled, "Deputy for Ohio",  and so forth for each state. Additionally, each Deputy has one or more "Actives" to assist him in the administration of the state. Active members of the Supreme Council who have served faithfully for ten years, or reach the age of 75, may be designated "Active, Emeritus". The Northern Jurisdiction Supreme Council meets yearly, in the even years by an executive session, and in the odd years, with the full membership invited.  The 33rd Degree is conferred on the odd years at the Annual Meeting. The head of the NMJ is titled the Sovereign Grand Commander, currently Bro. Peter John Samiec, 33°, who was elected to the position in 2021.

In the Northern Jurisdiction, there is a 46-month requirement for eligibility to receive the 33rd degree, and while there is a Meritorious Service Award (as well as a Distinguished Service Award), they are not required intermediate steps towards the 33°.

Supreme Council of Louisiana

The Supreme Council of Louisiana was founded in New Orleans in 1839 in the aftermath of the Morgan Affair. During this time, the Northern Jurisdiction consisted of John James Joseph Gourgas and Giles Fonda Yates who were "effective a Supreme Council of two people." Likewise, the Grand Commander of the Southern Jurisdiction, Moses Holbrook longed to "relinquish his responsibilities as Sovereign Grand Commander" moving to the rural frontier of Florida to serve as a doctor.

It was during this period that the Supreme Council of Louisiana emerged, which claimed its authority via "Cerneauism" – a type of Scottish Rite Masonry without ties to the either the Northern or Southern Jurisdictions.  In the 1840s and 1850s, Judge James Foulhouze served as Grand Commander. As relations improved with the Southern Jurisdiction, Foulhouze resigned “both as Grand Commander and member of this Supreme Council” on July 30, 1853. The Supreme Council of Louisiana determined to close its works and pass out of existence. They created "articles of Concordat & agreement" with the Southern Jurisdiction, and issued a "Preamble & Resolution," prepared during their meeting of November 18, 1854, which stated that it was "Resolved that a Committee of Three be appointed with full power & authority to adopt and accept, in the name of this Consistory, the articles of the agreement or Concordat" by which it would pass under the jurisdiction of Charleston. The committee of three consisted of Laffon de Ladébat, Samory, and Morel. Extracts from the minutes of the same meeting relate the instances of the Concordat and agreement. Similarly, the Grand Consistory of New Orleans under Charleston’s jurisdiction resolved, at their sitting of November 25, 1854, to sign and execute the agreement and Concordat. The Concordat was sent to Charleston on January 31, 1855, and signed on February 6, 1855, by Grand Commander John H. Honour, Lieutenant Grand Commander Charles M. Furman, and Grand Secretary General Albert G. Mackey. It was then taken back to New Orleans, likely by Mackey, and signed there on February 16–17, 1855, by Grand Commander Charles Claiborne, Lieutenant Grand Commander Claude Samory, and Grand Secretary General Charles Laffon de Ladébat. On the same day the Supreme Council at Charleston issued a warrant to “our well-beloved, Princes and Knights” Charles Claiborne, Claude P. Samory, Charles Laffon de Ladébat, John H. Holland, and others, creating a Grand Consistory of Louisiana, and installing them as officers with all the powers relative thereto.

However, on October 7, 1856, a year after the Supreme Council of Louisiana had formed its concordat with Charleston, Foulhouze (who resigned in 1853), Thomas Wharton Collens (resigned December 19, 1853) and J.J.E. Massicott (resigned December 3, 1853), “declared the Sup. Coun. to be still in existence and continued its works.” Foulhouze would be expelled by the Grand Orient of France in 1859 and would leave the Supreme Council of Louisiana completely. After the Civil War, the Grand Orient of France re-recognized the Supreme Council of Louisiana.

This organization still exists to the present day. New Orleans educator and Civil Rights activist George Longe was the head of this council for more than three decades. Under his watch the Supreme Council of Louisiana tripled in size and expanded to other states. His papers are held at the Amistad Research Center of Tulane University. As of 2023, the Most Powerful Sovereign Grand Commander of the Supreme Council of Louisiana is Ill. Bro. Eddie L. Gabriel, Sr. 33°.

See also
 List of Masonic Rites
 Masonic appendant bodies – An explanation of groups supplemental to "Blue Lodge" Freemasonry
 York Rite – Another group of Masonic appendant bodies.
 Grand College of Rites – An appendant body dedicated to preserving disused Masonic rituals and the rites of defunct Masonic societies.
 Rite of Memphis-Misraim – A European Masonic order dating from the 19th century, including degrees based on the three Blue Lodge and thirty three Scottish Rite degrees, as well as additional esoteric degrees.
 Rite of Baldwyn – A rite of seven degrees, practised only in Bristol, UK.
 Chamber of Reflection
 Esotericism

Notes

External links
Supreme Council 33°, Ancient and Accepted Scottish Rite, Southern Jurisdiction, USA
Supreme Council 33°,  Ancient Accepted Scottish Rite, Northern Masonic Jurisdiction
Supreme Council 33° for England and Wales
The Supreme Council for Scotland of the A&ASR
Ancient and Accepted Scottish Rite of Freemasonry of Canada
Ancient and Accepted Scottish Rite of Romania
Supreme Council of the Ancient & Accepted Scottish Rite for Australia
Scottish Rite Founding Fathers
Supreme Council of the Ancient and Accepted Scottish Rite for Russia
Ancient and Accepted Scottish Rite of Freemasonry historical marker

Supported institutions
Links to RiteCare Clinics which provide diagnostic evaluation and treatment of speech and language disorders, as well as learning disabilities in the Southern Jurisdiction, USA
Masonic Learning Centers for Children, Inc. which provide tutoring for children with dyslexia in the Northern Masonic Jurisdiction
Learning Centres for Children in Canada
Texas Scottish Rite Hospital for Children, a pediatric orthopedic hospital in Dallas, Texas
Children's Healthcare of Atlanta at Scottish Rite

Masonic rites